Pheona or Pheena  is a village in the northwestern Rohilkhand  region of Uttar Pradesh state of India. It is located in the administrative district of Bijnor  Spelling Feena, Funa, Phuna, Phoona, also may appear in some old records. But presently spelling PHEENA in English is in use.

Pheena (Pheona / Feena ) is a large and important village of district Bijnor. The distance of Pheena from the district headquarters is about 50 kilometers. It has a population of about 12000. Pheena is surrounded by a metalled road from all sides. Uttarapath, one of the three biggest routes of the early Vedic period, passed through here. Currently the State High Way 77 passes through Pheena.

History

According to the records kept by the families of this 320-year-old village, it was settled by two soldiers who were part of the armada assembled on the request of king of Haridwar. He had sent out a request various kingdoms of now Rajasthan to settle a complaint made by holy men staying in tarai jungles and nearby, the rishi-muni and sages were troubled by rohilla soldiers out for hunt in the forest. The soldiers used to disturb the havan fire, using it to cook the kill etc. The two soldiers probably came from Alwar. The village, also spelled as Pheena, used to be very important till mid 70s as it was the only one in the area with about 11 small scale sugar factories (crushers), an inter college i.e. a school till 12th. The villagers, did not allow for dispensary or a police station because of their strange belief that these bring trouble. Until now there is none and they have to travel out for them. The village head was often invited by British officials for judicial Bar duties as well, the last village head, also a decedent of the settlers, was Chaudhary Ramswaroop, his house, bearing his name Shri Ram Bhawan still houses the family of his younger son, martyred Inspector Hariraj Singh, now his daughters stay there.  His first son Dr Mahipal Singh stayed in the village. Grandson of Shri Ramswaroop Shri Virendra Singh Chauhan was the first engineer of village. His great grandson Group Captain Akhilesh Chauhan is the first pilot of the village, which is matter of pride for the village.

Facilities

Village has many schools, two banks, two mini banks, sub-power center, water tank, five sugarcane collecting centers, primary health center, two cooperative societies, primary veterinary hospital, pucca funeral site, several mobile towers, four government wells for irrigation, roadways bus Stand and Khareef irrigation canal facilities are available. There are some open pot jaggery/cane processing small industry also a banquet hall here. The village has four large ponds and a lake. There are five big temples in the village and in addition to these there are about 10 other Dev Sthalas. Pheena is connected with roadways buses and bus pass through Pheena every half an hour in day time, besides these there are some other means of transport. The market is held on Sunday and Wednesday in Pheena. The village has a lot of shops of various things. Two police posts are located at different places near the village of Pheena. There were also two small cinema houses in the 1990s-2000s. One of India's initial 10 continuous operating reference station has been installed by Survey of India at PHEENA[1]

Demographics
The people of PHEENA stands in the first line in education, socialist, culture and agricultural. People of Pheena participated in large numbers in the freedom struggle. [2] The names of 16 people of Pheena are listed  in government document as freedom fighters, which is a record. The names of these 16 fighters are as follows - Basant Singh, Randhir Singh, Hori Singh, Kshetrapal Singh, Dr. Bharat Singh, Dilip Singh, Raghuveer Singh, Maharaj Singh, Jaydev Singh, Daulat Singh, Sher Singh, Raghunath Singh, Dharam Singh, Ramswaroop Singh, Ramswaroop Chauhan, Shivnath Singh.

In memory of the fighters, the villagers have jointly constructed the memorial. This memorial built near Bel Wala Chowk on Chandpur Pheena Amroha Marg. Construction of this memorial started in 2020–21. The immortal martyr Ashok Kumar of Pheena sacrificed his life for the country in the Kargil war. He was the first soldier of the district to be martyred in Kargil. His memorial is also built on Bell Wala Chowk. Chandpur to Pheena Marg [3] and primary school are currently named after him. Two freedom fighters Balkaran Singh and Parveen Singh were martyred in the freedom movement 1942, but unfortunately remained anonymous.

Industry

During the rainy season, a famous fair of Naumi dedicated to Jahar Dev Goga Ji is held every year on the Kheda situated in the south of the village which derives a significant economic activity in the region. Whilst  Sugarcane and jaggery are produced in large quantities in Pheena. There is also adequate production of wheat, black gram, rice, green gram, mango, blackberries. Soil Pottery made in Pheena is quite famous.

Education
The people of Pheena have been ahead in education since the beginning. Primary schools have been run since 1920, primary school for girls since 1930  junior school since 1940, high school since 1952 and inter college since 1962. Khem Singh Arya Kanya Inter College is a girls inter college. The Saraswati Shishu Mandir has also been in operation since the 1970s-80s. At this time there are many more schools besides these. Haripal Shastri College is a graduation college, Pheena also has an ITI college. Due to the influence of these schools, more than five hundred people of PHEENA remained in government service. Many people from this village are Engineers, marine engineer, professors, scientists, researchers, litterateurs, poets, entrepreneurs and social workers.

Politics
Many individuals of PHEENA contributed significantly to the politics of the district. Among them Haripal Singh Shastri was MLA and district president of Panchayat and Sahkarita. Many people of PHEENA are becoming active in politics  played a very important role in the construction of the Independence Struggle Memorial in Pheena and the Survey of India's Continuous Operating Reference station.

Activities

Pheena has a lot of social activities. During the rainy season, a Navami fair is held for 20–25 days, Ramlila is organized. Procession (shobha yatra) is performed on Shri Krishna Janmashtami, Republic Day and Independence Day. From 1930 to 1965 the Arya Samaj had great influence in the village. However, Gayatri Pariwar's influence increased from the 1990s. In 2020-21 the Gayatri Shaktipeeth has been established in Pheena. The Panch Parmeshwar tradition was also prevalent in the village to deal with mutual disputes till the 1990s.

Dr. Sanjay Kumar Sahni, lecturer of Sarvjanik Ary Inter College, received the state level award for drawing in 2018.

Geography

Pheona is located at latitude 29°04'60"N and longitude 78°20'60"E, at an altitude of 680 feet.

References

External links
Pheona page on Falling Rain Genomics, http://www.fallingrain.com/world/IN/36/Pheona.html
Brief page on Pheona, http://www.india9.com/i9show/Pheona-81663.htm

Cities and towns in Bijnor district